The Jadgal (also known as Nummaṛ or az-zighālī) are a Sindhi-Baloch ethno-linguistic group who speak the Jadgali language. They are found in the Balochistan region of Iran and Pakistan.

History 

Jadgals originally came from Sind and spoke the Sindhi language, before it started diverging into another language. Many historians believe that the Jadgal were the original natives of Balochistan before the Baloch arrived. The Arwal and Manjotha tribes of Dera Ghazi Khan are of Jadgal origin. When the Arabs arrived in modern day Sind and Baluchistan, they met the Jadgal at the coast of Makran where the Arab name of az-zighālī comes from. Many Jats in Pakistan are actually of Jadgal origin. In 1811, Saidi Balochis as well as Jadgal mercenary troops were killed in a battle with the Wahhabis in a battle against the Sultanate of Oman.

Demographics 
Around 100,000 Jadgals live in Pakistan according to a 1998 census conducted by Pakistan. In Iran, the Sardarzahi ethnic group is of Jadgal origin, claiming to be from Sindh. The rest of the Jadgals number around 25,000 according to a 2008 census conducted by Iran. All of the Jadgals in Iran live in the Sistan and Baluchistan province.

Language 

Most Jadgals speak their native Jadgali language.  It is one of the Sindhi languages and one of the only two native Indo-Aryan languages spoken in Iran. Many linguists believe that the Lasi language of the Lasi people may be related to Jadgali.

References 

Sindhi people
Balochistan
Ethnic groups in Iran
Ethnic groups in Pakistan